Tak Bai is a border town on Malaysia-Thailand Border, the capital of Tak Bai District, Narathiwat Province. Visitors can visit Malaysia by Pengkalan Kubur pass, Kelantan state.

Administratively it is a town (thesaban mueang), and covers 9.14 km2 of the subdistrict (tambon) Che He. As of 2007 it has a population of 17,317.

It is the location of the Tak Bai Incident of 25 October 2004 in which at least 85 demonstrators died.

History
During the 19th century it was known as Tabal, part of the state of Kelantan, then an autonomous tributary state of Siam. Under the 1909 Anglo-Siamese Treaty the Golok River was made the new border and thus Tabal was reassigned to Narathiwat Province.
The town was created as a sanitary district (sukhaphiban) in 1956. Like all sanitary districts, it was upgraded to a subdistrict municipality (thesaban tambon) in May 1999. On 31 January 2008 it was upgraded to a town (thesaban mueang).

References

External links
Website of the town (Thai)

Populated places in Narathiwat province
Malaysia–Thailand border crossings